Brestir Sigmundsson (10th century-ca. 970) was a chieftain in the Faroe Islands. 

Beinir was from Skúvoy. He was the son of  Sigmund the Elder. Together with Cesilia, he had the son Sigmund Brestisson (961-1005) who was the first to bring Christianity to the islands. Jointly with his brother Beinir Sigmundsson, he ruled over half of the Faroe Islands. Brestir and his brother were eventually murdered by the rival chieftains Svínoyar-Bjarni and Havgrímur when they stayed at a farm on the island Stóra Dímun.

References

Other Sources
German Wikipedia article :de:Brestir Sigmundsson

10th-century Faroese people
10th-century rulers in Europe
970 deaths
Year of birth unknown